Cleopatra grandidieri is a species of freshwater snails with an operculum, aquatic gastropod molluscs in the family Paludomidae. 

This species is endemic to Madagascar.

References

 Crosse, H. & Fischer, P. (1872). Diagnoses molluscorum novorum, insulae Madagascar dictae incolarum. Journal de Conchyliologie 20: 209–210
 Fischer-Piette, E., 1950. Liste des types décrits dans le Journal de Conchyliologie et conservés dans la collection de ce journal (avec planches)(suite). Journal de Conchyliologie 90: 149-180
 Brown, D. S. (1980). Freshwater snails of Africa and their medical importance. Taylor & Francis, London. 1-487
 Fischer-Piette, E. & Vukadinovic, D. (1973). Sur les Mollusques Fluviatiles de Madagascar. Malacologia. 12: 339-378

External links
 Crosse H. & Fischer P. (1878). Description d'une espèce de coquille fluviatile nouvelle, provenant de Madagascar. Journal de Conchyliologie. 26: 73-74

Paludomidae
Molluscs of Madagascar
Taxonomy articles created by Polbot